The 1987–88 NBA season was the Nuggets' 12th season in the NBA and 21st season as a franchise. During the offseason, the Nuggets acquired Michael Adams from the Washington Bullets. The Nuggets finished first place in the Midwest Division with a 54–28 record. Head coach Doug Moe was named Coach of The Year. Alex English and Fat Lever were both selected for the 1988 NBA All-Star Game. In the first round of the playoffs, they defeated the Seattle SuperSonics in five games, but lost to the 3rd-seeded Dallas Mavericks six games in the semifinals.

Draft picks

Roster

Regular season

Season standings

z – clinched division title
y – clinched division title
x – clinched playoff spot

Record vs. opponents

Game log

Regular season

|- align="center" bgcolor="#ccffcc"
| 1
| November 6
| L.A. Clippers
| W 139–93
|
|
|
| McNichols Sports Arena
| 1–0
|- align="center" bgcolor="#ccffcc"
| 2
| November 7
| @ Golden State
| W 103–99
|
|
|
| Oakland–Alameda County Coliseum Arena
| 2–0
|- align="center" bgcolor="#ffcccc"
| 3
| November 10
| @ Sacramento
| L 123–134
|
|
|
| ARCO Arena
| 2–1
|- align="center" bgcolor="#ccffcc"
| 4
| November 12
| Portland
| W 126–113
|
|
|
| McNichols Sports Arena
| 3–1
|- align="center" bgcolor="#ccffcc"
| 5
| November 14
| Sacramento
| W 130–109
|
|
|
| McNichols Sports Arena
| 4–1
|- align="center" bgcolor="#ffcccc"
| 6
| November 17
| @ Utah
| L 110–120
|
|
|
| Salt Palace Acord Arena
| 4–2
|- align="center" bgcolor="#ffcccc"
| 7
| November 18
| Indiana
| L 106–117
|
|
|
| McNichols Sports Arena
| 4–3
|- align="center" bgcolor="#ccffcc"
| 8
| November 20
| San Antonio
| W 156–142
|
|
|
| McNichols Sports Arena
| 5–3
|- align="center" bgcolor="#ccffcc"
| 9
| November 21
| @ L.A. Clippers
| W 97–91
|
|
|
| Los Angeles Memorial Sports Arena
| 6–3
|- align="center" bgcolor="#ccffcc"
| 10
| November 24
| New Jersey
| W 132–104
|
|
|
| McNichols Sports Arena
| 7–3
|- align="center" bgcolor="#ffcccc"
| 11
| November 27, 19878:30 MST
| @ L.A. Lakers
| L 119–127
|
|
|
| The Forum17,505
| 7–4
|- align="center" bgcolor="#ccffcc"
| 12
| November 28, 19877:30 PM MST
| Dallas
| W 106–98
|
|
|
| McNichols Sports Arena13,400
| 8–4

|- align="center" bgcolor="#ffcccc"
| 13
| December 1
| @ Houston
| L 101–106
|
|
|
| The Summit
| 8–5
|- align="center" bgcolor="#ccffcc"
| 14
| December 2
| Sacramento
| W 147–120
|
|
|
| McNichols Sports Arena
| 9–5
|- align="center" bgcolor="#ccffcc"
| 15
| December 4
| Chicago
| W 105–89
|
|
|
| McNichols Sports Arena
| 10–5
|- align="center" bgcolor="#ffcccc"
| 16
| December 5, 19876:30 PM MST
| @ Dallas
| L 96–109
|
|
|
| Reunion Arena17,007
| 10–6
|- align="center" bgcolor="#ccffcc"
| 17
| December 9
| @ Boston
| W 124–119
|
|
|
| Boston Garden
| 11–6
|- align="center" bgcolor="#ffcccc"
| 18
| December 10
| @ New York
| L 97–113
|
|
|
| Madison Square Garden
| 11–7
|- align="center" bgcolor="#ccffcc"
| 19
| December 12
| @ Philadelphia
| W 131–121
|
|
|
| The Spectrum
| 12–7
|- align="center" bgcolor="#ccffcc"
| 20
| December 16
| Houston
| W 132–113
|
|
|
| McNichols Sports Arena
| 13–7
|- align="center" bgcolor="#ffcccc"
| 21
| December 18
| @ San Antonio
| L 114–133
|
|
|
| HemisFair Arena
| 13–8
|- align="center" bgcolor="#ccffcc"
| 22
| December 19
| @ Houston
| W 121–117
|
|
|
| The Summit
| 14–8
|- align="center" bgcolor="#ccffcc"
| 23
| December 22
| Phoenix
| W 119–104
|
|
|
| McNichols Sports Arena
| 15–8
|- align="center" bgcolor="#ffcccc"
| 24
| December 23
| @ Golden State
| L 117–129
|
|
|
| Oakland–Alameda County Coliseum Arena
| 15–9
|- align="center" bgcolor="#ccffcc"
| 25
| December 26
| Seattle
| W 115–111
|
|
|
| McNichols Sports Arena
| 16–9
|- align="center" bgcolor="#ffcccc"
| 26
| December 28
| @ Seattle
| L 100–108
|
|
|
| Seattle Center Coliseum
| 16–10
|- align="center" bgcolor="#ffcccc"
| 27
| December 29
| Utah
| L 97–98
|
|
|
| McNichols Sports Arena
| 16–11

|- align="center" bgcolor="#ccffcc"
| 28
| January 1
| @ Washington
| W 124–109
|
|
|
| Capital Centre
| 17–11
|- align="center" bgcolor="#ccffcc"
| 29
| January 2, 19885:30 MST
| @ Detroit
| W 151–142
|
|
|
| Pontiac Silverdome23,746
| 18–11
|- align="center" bgcolor="#ffcccc"
| 30
| January 4
| @ Cleveland
| L 101–122
|
|
|
| Richfield Coliseum
| 18–12
|- align="center" bgcolor="#ccffcc"
| 31
| January 6
| @ New Jersey
| W 98–93
|
|
|
| Brendan Byrne Arena
| 19–12
|- align="center" bgcolor="#ffcccc"
| 32
| January 7
| @ Chicago
| L 96–100
|
|
|
| Chicago Stadium
| 19–13
|- align="center" bgcolor="#ffcccc"
| 33
| January 9
| @ Atlanta
| L 105–113
|
|
|
| The Omni
| 19–14
|- align="center" bgcolor="#ffcccc"
| 34
| January 11
| @ Phoenix
| L 115–127
|
|
|
| Arizona Veterans Memorial Coliseum
| 19–15
|- align="center" bgcolor="#ccffcc"
| 35
| January 14
| Atlanta
| W 115–112
|
|
|
| McNichols Sports Arena
| 20–15
|- align="center" bgcolor="#ccffcc"
| 36
| January 16
| Golden State
| W 115–94
|
|
|
| McNichols Sports Arena
| 21–15
|- align="center" bgcolor="#ffcccc"
| 37
| January 18, 19882:00 MST
| Detroit
| L 116–123
|
|
|
| McNichols Sports Arena13,004
| 21–16
|- align="center" bgcolor="#ccffcc"
| 38
| January 21, 19887:30 PM MST
| L.A. Lakers
| W 115–113
|
|
|
| McNichols Sports Arena17,022
| 22–16
|- align="center" bgcolor="#ffcccc"
| 39
| January 22
| @ Portland
| L 106–126
|
|
|
| Memorial Coliseum
| 22–17
|- align="center" bgcolor="#ccffcc"
| 40
| January 28
| Milwaukee
| W 122–113
|
|
|
| McNichols Sports Arena
| 23–17
|- align="center" bgcolor="#ccffcc"
| 41
| January 30
| L.A. Clippers
| W 124–106
|
|
|
| McNichols Sports Arena
| 24–17

|- align="center" bgcolor="#ccffcc"
| 42
| February 3, 19887:30 PM MST
| Dallas
| W 115–105
|
|
|
| McNichols Sports Arena10,667
| 25–17
|- align="center" bgcolor="#ccffcc"
| 43
| February 4
| @ San Antonio
| W 129–123
|
|
|
| HemisFair Arena
| 26–17
|- align="center" bgcolor="#ccffcc"
| 44
| February 9
| San Antonio
| W 136-108
|
|
|
| McNichols Sports Arena
| 27–17
|- align="center" bgcolor="#ffcccc"
| 45
| February 11, 19887:30 PM MST
| L.A. Lakers
| L 105–120
|
|
|
| McNichols Sports Arena17,022
| 27–18
|- align="center" bgcolor="#ffcccc"
| 46
| February 12
| @ Portland
| L 105–120
|
|
|
| Memorial Coliseum
| 27–19
|- align="center" bgcolor="#ccffcc"
| 47
| February 14
| Utah
| W 107–93
|
|
|
| McNichols Sports Arena
| 28–19
|- align="center" bgcolor="#ccffcc"
| 48
| February 17
| Boston
| W 138–125
|
|
|
| McNichols Sports Arena
| 29–19
|- align="center" bgcolor="#ffcccc"
| 49
| February 20
| @ Phoenix
| L 108–128
|
|
|
| Arizona Veterans Memorial Coliseum
| 29–20
|- align="center" bgcolor="#ccffcc"
| 50
| February 22
| Washington
| W 100–87
|
|
|
| McNichols Sports Arena
| 30–20
|- align="center" bgcolor="#ccffcc"
| 51
| February 24
| @ Utah
| W 123–120
|
|
|
| Salt Palace Acord Arena
| 31–20
|- align="center" bgcolor="#ccffcc"
| 52
| February 26
| Philadelphia
| W 120–104
|
|
|
| McNichols Sports Arena
| 32–20
|- align="center" bgcolor="#ccffcc"
| 53
| February 28
| New York
| W 109–100
|
|
|
| McNichols Sports Arena
| 33–20
|- align="center" bgcolor="#ffcccc"
| 54
| February 29, 19886:30 PM MST
| @ Dallas
| L 96–123
|
|
|
| Reunion Arena17,007
| 33–21

|- align="center" bgcolor="#ccffcc"
| 55
| March 2
| Cleveland
| W 99–81
|
|
|
| McNichols Sports Arena
| 34–21
|- align="center" bgcolor="#ccffcc"
| 56
| March 4
| Phoenix
| W 116–108
|
|
|
| McNichols Sports Arena
| 35–21
|- align="center" bgcolor="#ccffcc"
| 57
| March 5
| @ Seattle
| W 115–102
|
|
|
| Seattle Center Coliseum
| 36–21
|- align="center" bgcolor="#ffcccc"
| 58
| March 7
| @ Sacramento
| L 114–116 (OT)
|
|
|
| ARCO Arena
| 36–22
|- align="center" bgcolor="#ffcccc"
| 59
| March 8
| Houston
| L 103–113
|
|
|
| McNichols Sports Arena
| 36–23
|- align="center" bgcolor="#ffcccc"
| 60
| March 11
| @ Milwaukee
| L 93–132
|
|
|
| MECCA Arena
| 36–24
|- align="center" bgcolor="#ccffcc"
| 61
| March 13
| @ Indiana
| W 108–100
|
|
|
| Market Square Arena
| 37–24
|- align="center" bgcolor="#ffcccc"
| 62
| March 14
| Utah
| L 115–116
|
|
|
| McNichols Sports Arena
| 37–25
|- align="center" bgcolor="#ccffcc"
| 63
| March 17
| Portland
| W 116–115 (OT)
|
|
|
| McNichols Sports Arena
| 38–25
|- align="center" bgcolor="#ffcccc"
| 64
| March 18
| @ Utah
| L 111–118
|
|
|
| Salt Palace Acord Arena
| 38–26
|- align="center" bgcolor="#ccffcc"
| 65
| March 20
| Seattle
| W 108–95
|
|
|
| McNichols Sports Arena
| 39–26
|- align="center" bgcolor="#ccffcc"
| 66
| March 22
| San Antonio
| W 136–109
|
|
|
| McNichols Sports Arena
| 40–26
|- align="center" bgcolor="#ccffcc"
| 67
| March 23
| @ L.A. Clippers
| W 118–108
|
|
|
| Los Angeles Memorial Sports Arena
| 41–26
|- align="center" bgcolor="#ccffcc"
| 68
| March 25, 19888:30 PM MST
| @ L.A. Lakers
| W 120–119
|
|
|
| The Forum17,505
| 42–26
|- align="center" bgcolor="#ccffcc"
| 69
| March 26
| @ Golden State
| W 131–108
|
|
|
| Oakland–Alameda County Coliseum Arena
| 43–26
|- align="center" bgcolor="#ccffcc"
| 70
| March 29
| @ Sacramento
| W 107–103
|
|
|
| ARCO Arena
| 44–26
|- align="center" bgcolor="#ccffcc"
| 71
| March 31
| Sacramento
| W 121–111
|
|
|
| McNichols Sports Arena
| 45–26

|- align="center" bgcolor="#ccffcc"
| 72
| April 2
| Golden State
| W 123–107
|
|
|
| McNichols Sports Arena
| 46–26
|- align="center" bgcolor="#ccffcc"
| 73
| April 5
| @ Houston
| W 110–97
|
|
|
| The Summit
| 47–26
|- align="center" bgcolor="#ccffcc"
| 74
| April 8
| @ San Antonio
| W 129–124 (OT)
|
|
|
| HemisFair Arena
| 48–26
|- align="center" bgcolor="#ffcccc"
| 75
| April 9, 19886:30 PM MDT
| @ Dallas
| L 109–135
|
|
|
| Reunion Arena17,007
| 48–27
|- align="center" bgcolor="#ccffcc"
| 76
| April 11
| @ Phoenix
| W 123–119
|
|
|
| Arizona Veterans Memorial Coliseum
| 49–27
|- align="center" bgcolor="#ccffcc"
| 77
| April 13, 19887:30 PM MDT
| L.A. Lakers
| W 120–106
|
|
|
| McNichols Sports Arena17,022
| 50–27
|- align="center" bgcolor="#ccffcc"
| 78
| April 15
| Houston
| W 132–125
|
|
|
| McNichols Sports Arena
| 51–27
|- align="center" bgcolor="#ccffcc"
| 79
| April 17, 19882:00 PM MDT
| Dallas
| W 133–122
|
|
|
| McNichols Sports Arena17,022
| 52–27
|- align="center" bgcolor="#ccffcc"
| 80
| April 19
| Seattle
| W 134–114
|
|
|
| McNichols Sports Arena
| 53–27
|- align="center" bgcolor="#ffcccc"
| 81
| April 22
| @ Portland
| L 135–141 (OT)
|
|
|
| Memorial Coliseum
| 53–28
|- align="center" bgcolor="#ccffcc"
| 82
| April 23
| L.A. Clippers
| W 134–109
|
|
|
| McNichols Sports Arena
| 54–28

Playoffs

|-
|- align="center" bgcolor="#ccffcc"
| 1
| April 29
| Seattle
| W 126–123
| Alex English (28)
| Fat Lever (11)
| Fat Lever (8)
| McNichols Sports Arena17,022
| 1–0
|- align="center" bgcolor="#ffcccc"
| 2
| May 1
| Seattle
| L 91–111
| English, Evans (16)
| Fat Lever (12)
| Michael Adams (5)
| McNichols Sports Arena17,022
| 1–1
|- align="center" bgcolor="#ccffcc"
| 3
| May 3
| @ Seattle
| W 125–114
| Blair Rasmussen (28)
| Blair Rasmussen (12)
| Adams, Lever (7)
| Seattle Center Coliseum14,250
| 2–1
|- align="center" bgcolor="#ffcccc"
| 4
| May 5
| @ Seattle
| L 117–127
| Jay Vincent (28)
| Danny Schayes (8)
| English, Evans (5)
| Seattle Center Coliseum14,250
| 2–2
|- align="center" bgcolor="#ccffcc"
| 5
| May 7
| Seattle
| W 115–96
| Alex English (23)
| Jay Vincent (7)
| Alex English (7)
| McNichols Sports Arena16,040
| 3–2
|-

|-
|- align="center" bgcolor="#ccffcc"
| 1
| May 10, 19887:30 PM MDT
| Dallas
| W 126–115
| Fat Lever (30)
| Fat Lever (11)
| Lever, English (8)
| McNichols Sports Arena17,022
| 1–0
|- align="center" bgcolor="#ffcccc"
| 2
| May 12, 19888:00 PM MDT
| Dallas
| L 108–112
| Lever, English (22)
| Danny Schayes (12)
| Michael Adams (7)
| McNichols Sports Arena17,022
| 1–1
|- align="center" bgcolor="#ccffcc"
| 3
| May 14, 19881:30 PM MDT
| @ Dallas
| W 107–105
| Alex English (23)
| Fat Lever (11)
| Fat Lever (12)
| Reunion Arena17,007
| 2–1
|- align="center" bgcolor="#ffcccc"
| 4
| May 15, 19886:00 PM MDT
| @ Dallas
| L 103–124
| Alex English (24)
| Wayne Cooper (10)
| Michael Adams (9)
| Reunion Arena17,007
| 2–2
|- align="center" bgcolor="#ffcccc"
| 5
| May 17, 19888:00 PM MDT
| Dallas
| L 106–110
| Danny Schayes (33)
| Danny Schayes (13)
| Adams, English (6)
| McNichols Sports Arena17,022
| 2–3
|- align="center" bgcolor="#ffcccc"
| 6
| May 19, 19888:00 PM MDT
| @ Dallas
| L 95–108
| Alex English (34)
| Danny Schayes (9)
| Michael Adams (8)
| Reunion Arena17,007
| 2–4
|-

Player statistics

Season

Playoffs

Awards and records
 Doug Moe, NBA Coach of the Year Award
 Lafayette Lever, NBA All-Defensive Second Team

Transactions

References

See also
 1987–88 NBA season

Denver Nuggets seasons
Denver
Denver Nugget
Denver Nugget